A gimmick capacitor is a capacitor made by twisting two pieces of insulated wire together.  The capacitance may be varied by loosening or tightening the winding. The capacitance can also be reduced by shortening the twisted pair by cutting.  The available capacitance is on the order of 1pF/inch (0.4 pF/cm).

Refs 

Capacitors